The checkered keelback (Fowlea piscator), also known commonly as the Asiatic water snake, is a common species in the subfamily Natricinae of the family Colubridae. The species is endemic to Asia. It is non-venomous.

Description
The eye of F. piscator is rather small and shorter than its distance from the nostril in the adult. Its rostral scale is visible from above. The internasal scales are much narrowed anteriorly and subtriangular, with the anterior angle truncated and as long as the prefrontal scales. The frontal scale is longer than its distance from the end of the snout, and as long as the parietals or a little shorter. The loreal is nearly as long as it is deep. There are one preocular and three (rarely four) post-oculars. Its temporals are 2+2 or 2+3. There are normally nine upper labials, with the fourth and fifth entering the eye; and five lower labials in contact with the anterior chin-shields, which are shorter than the posterior. The dorsal scales are arranged in 19 rows, strongly keeled, with outer rows smooth. The ventrals number 125–158, the anal is divided, and the subcaudals number 64–90. Coloration is very variable, consisting of dark spots arranged quincuncially and often separated by a whitish network, or of black longitudinal bands on a pale ground, or of dark crossbands, with or without whitish spots. Two oblique black streaks, one below and the other behind the eye, are nearly constant. The lower parts are white, with or without black margins to the shields.

The checkered keelback is a medium-sized snake, but may grow to be large.

Defensive behavior
Most of the time this snake tries to raise its head as much as possible and expand its neck skin mimicking a cobra hood and intimidate the threat. Though it is non-venomous to humans, it can deliver a painful bite which is inflammatory.

F. piscator may lose its tail as an escape mechanism. A rare case of such autotomy is reported from Vietnam.

Habitat
The preferred habitat of F. piscator is in or near freshwater lakes or rivers.

Diet
F. piscator feeds mainly on small fish and water frogs.

Reproduction
F. piscator is oviparous. Clutch size is usually 30-70 eggs, but may be as few as 4 or as many as 100. Egg size is also variable. The female guards the eggs until they hatch.

Geographic range
F. piscator is found in Afghanistan, Bangladesh, Pakistan, Sri Lanka, India, Myanmar, Nepal, Thailand, Laos, Cambodia, Vietnam, West Malaysia, China (Zhejiang, Jiangxi, Fujian, Guangdong, Hainan, Guangxi, Yunnan), Taiwan, Australia and Indonesia (Sumatra, Java, Borneo, Celebes = Sulawesi)

type locality: "East Indies".

Subspecies
F. p. melanzostus  – Indonesia (Borneo [?], Java, Sulawesi [?]; Sumatra), India (Andaman and Nicobar Islands)
F. p. piscator  – Bangladesh, Bhutan, India, Myanmar, Pakistan, People's Republic of China (including Hainan), Sri Lanka, Taiwan, and Thailand

Nota bene: A trinomial authority in parentheses indicates that the subspecies was originally described in a genus other than Fowlea.

Taxonomy
The subspecies F. p. melanzostus was raised to species status, as Fowlea melanzostus, by Indraneil Das in 1996.

Gallery for identification characteristics

References

Further reading
Boulenger GA (1893). Catalogue of the Snakes in the .Volume I., Containing the Families ... Colubridæ Aglyphæ, part. London: Trustees of the British Museum (Natural History). (Taylor and Francis, printers). xiii + 448 pp. + Plates I-XXVIII. (Tropidonotus piscator, pp. 230–232).
Dutt, Kalma (1970). "Chromosome Variation in Two Populations of Xenochrophis piscator Schn. from North and South India (Serpentes, Colubridae)". Cytologia 35: 455–464.
Schneider JG (1799). Historiae Amphibiorum naturalis et literariae. Fasciculus Primus, continens Ranas, Calamitas, Bufones, Salamandras et Hydros. Jena: F. Frommann. xiii + 264 pp. + corrigenda + Plate I. (Hydrus piscator, new species, pp. 247–248). (in Latin).
Smith MA (1943). The Fauna of British India, Ceylon and Burma, Including the Whole of the Indo-Chinese Sub-region. Amphibia and Reptilia. Vol. III.—Serpentes. London: Secretary of State for India. (Taylor and Francis, printers). xii + 583 pp. (Tropidonotus piscator, pp. 293–296, Figures 95–96).

External links 

Fowlea
Reptiles of Afghanistan
Reptiles of Bangladesh
Reptiles of Myanmar
Reptiles of India
Reptiles of Indonesia
Reptiles of Laos
Reptiles of Malaysia
Reptiles of Pakistan
Reptiles of Sri Lanka
Reptiles of Taiwan
Reptiles of Thailand
Reptiles described in 1799
Taxa named by Johann Gottlob Theaenus Schneider
Snakes of China
Snakes of Vietnam
Reptiles of Borneo